Obelya Glacier, Sentinel Range
 Oberbauer Point, Anvers Island  
 Obidim Peak, Trinity Peninsula 
 Obitel Peninsula, Anvers Island 
 Oborishte Ridge, Greenwich Island
 Obretenik Bastion, Danco Coast  
 Obzor Hill, Trinity Peninsula 
 Odesos Buttress, Nordenskjöld Coast 
 Odometer Rock, Nelson Island
 Odrin Bay, Nordenskjöld Coast  
 Oeagrus Beach Snow Island
 Oescus Island, Robert Island
 Ofelia Island, Joinville Island
 Ogled Peak, Trinity Peninsula 
 Ognen Cove, Trinity Peninsula 
 Ogosta Point, Livingston Island  
 Ogoya Glacier, Trinity Peninsula  
 Ograzhden Cove, Livingston Island  
 Ogygia Island, Snow Island
 Ohoden Col, Trinity Peninsula  
 Ojeda Beach, Livingston Island
 Okol Rocks, Aitcho Islands  
 Okorsh Saddle, Oscar II Coast
 Olusha Cove, Trinity Island
 Omurtag Pass, Livingston Island  
 Ongal Peak, Livingston Island  
 Onogur Islands, Robert Island  
 Opaka Rocks, Robert Island  
 Opalchenie Peak, Vinson Massif
 Opitsvet Lake, Livingston Island
 Opizo Peak, Brabant Island
 Orbel Peak, Graham Coast
 Orcho Glacier, Clarence Island 
 Oread Lake, Livingston Island
 Oreshak Peak, Sentinel Range  
 Organa Peak, Smith Island  
 Orizari Glacier, Sentinel Range
 Orpheus Gate, Livingston Island 
 Orsini Rock, Livingston Island 
 Orsoya Rocks, Robert Island  
 Oryahovo Heights, Livingston Island  
 Oselna Glacier, Alexander Island
 Osenovlag Island, Robert Island
 Oshane Glacier, Brabant Island
 Osikovo Ridge, Graham Coast
 Osmar Strait, South Shetland Islands  
 Osogovo Bay, Livingston Island 
 Ostrusha Nunatak, Sentinel Range 
 Ovech Glacier, Smith Island

See also 
 Bulgarian toponyms in Antarctica

External links 
 Bulgarian Antarctic Gazetteer
 SCAR Composite Gazetteer of Antarctica
 Antarctic Digital Database (ADD). Scale 1:250000 topographic map of Antarctica with place-name search.
 L. Ivanov. Bulgarian toponymic presence in Antarctica. Polar Week at the National Museum of Natural History in Sofia, 2–6 December 2019

Bibliography 
 J. Stewart. Antarctica: An Encyclopedia. Jefferson, N.C. and London: McFarland, 2011. 1771 pp.  
 L. Ivanov. Bulgarian Names in Antarctica. Sofia: Manfred Wörner Foundation, 2021. Second edition. 539 pp.  (in Bulgarian)
 G. Bakardzhieva. Bulgarian toponyms in Antarctica. Paisiy Hilendarski University of Plovdiv: Research Papers. Vol. 56, Book 1, Part A, 2018 – Languages and Literature, pp. 104-119 (in Bulgarian)
 L. Ivanov and N. Ivanova. Bulgarian names. In: The World of Antarctica. Generis Publishing, 2022. pp. 114-115. 

Antarctica
 
Bulgarian toponyms in Antarctica
Names of places in Antarctica